This was the first ever Commonwealth tournament held, Mahesh Bhupathi and Leander Paes of India were the top seed. But they lost in the semifinals to the champions Paul Hanley and Peter Luczak, and had to settle for the bronze medal. Hanley and Luczak defeated Ross Hutchins and Ken Skupski of England 6–4, 3–6, 6–3 to win the gold medal.

Medalists

Seeds

Main draw

Draw

Finals

Top half

Bottom half

References

Tennis at the 2010 Commonwealth Games